Waasmunster is a municipality located in the Flemish province of East Flanders, in Belgium. The municipality only comprises the town of Waasmunster proper. In 2021, Waasmunster had a total population of 10,912. The total area is 31.93 km2.

Roosenberg Abbey, founded in the 13th century, is situated here.

Illusionist Louis Courtois, writer Cyriel Geerinck, football manager and scout Urbain Haesaert and DJ/music producer Michaël Bella were born in Waasmunster.

References

External links

Official website - Only available in Dutch

Municipalities of East Flanders
Populated places in East Flanders
Waasland